is a Japanese badminton player who affiliated with Nihon Unisys team since April 2011. He was a bronze medalist at the 2013 East Asian Games in the men's doubles event, and was part of the Japanese team that won silver medal at the 2016 Asia Team Championships. He won the mixed doubles titles at the 2012 Canada Open and 2014 Russian Open. He retired from the Unisys team on 31 March 2017.

Achievements

East Asian Games 
Men's doubles

BWF Grand Prix 
The BWF Grand Prix had two levels, the BWF Grand Prix and Grand Prix Gold. It was a series of badminton tournaments sanctioned by the Badminton World Federation (BWF) which was held from 2007 to 2017.

Men's doubles

Mixed doubles

  BWF Grand Prix Gold tournament
  BWF Grand Prix tournament

BWF International Challenge/Series 
Men's doubles

  BWF International Challenge tournament
  BWF International Series tournament
  BWF Future Series tournament

References

External links 
 

Living people
1988 births
Sportspeople from Fukuoka Prefecture
Japanese male badminton players
21st-century Japanese people